Perinatal mortality (PNM) refers to the death of a fetus or neonate and is the basis to calculate the perinatal mortality rate. Variations in the precise definition of the perinatal mortality exist, specifically concerning the issue of inclusion or exclusion of early fetal and late neonatal fatalities. The World Health Organization defines perinatal mortality as the "number of stillbirths and deaths in the first week of life per 1,000 total births, the  perinatal period commences at 22 completed weeks (154 days) of gestation, and ends seven completed days after birth", but other definitions have been used.

The UK figure is about 8 per 1,000 and varies markedly by social class with the highest rates seen in Asian women. Globally, an estimated 2.6 million neonates died in 2013 before the first month of age down from 4.5 million in 1990.

Causes

Preterm birth is the most common cause of perinatal mortality, causing almost 30 percent of neonatal deaths. Infant respiratory distress syndrome, in turn, is the leading cause of death in preterm infants, affecting about 1% of newborn infants. Birth defects cause about 21 percent of neonatal death.

Fetal mortality
Fetal mortality refers to stillbirths or fetal death. It encompasses any death of a fetus after 20 weeks of gestation or 500 gm. In some definitions of the PNM early fetal mortality (week 20–27 gestation) is not included, and the PNM may only include late fetal death and neonatal death. Fetal death can also be divided into death prior to labor, antenatal (antepartum) death, and death during labor, intranatal (intrapartum) death.

Neonatal mortality
Neonatal mortality refers to death of a live-born baby within the first 28 days of life. Early neonatal mortality refers to the death of a live-born baby within the first seven days of life, while late neonatal mortality refers to death after 7 days until before 28 days. Some definitions of the PNM include only the early neonatal mortality. Neonatal mortality is affected by the quality of in-hospital care for the neonate. Neonatal mortality and postneonatal mortality (covering the remaining 11 months of the first year of life) are reflected in the infant mortality rate.

Perinatal mortality rate

The PNMR refers to the number of perinatal deaths per 1,000 total births. It is usually reported on an annual basis. It is a major marker to assess the quality of health care delivery. Comparisons between different rates may be hampered by varying definitions, registration bias, and differences in the underlying risks of the populations.

PNMRs vary widely and may be below 10 for certain developed countries and more than 10 times higher in developing countries. The WHO has not published contemporary data.

Effects of neonatal nutrition on neonatal mortality 
Probiotic supplementation of preterm and low birthweight babies during their first month of life can reduce the risk of blood infections, bowel sickness and death in low- and middle-income settings.  However, supplementing with Vitamin A does not reduce the risk of death and increases the risk of bulging fontanelle, which may cause brain damage.

See also
Maternal death
Miscarriage
Neonatal intensive care unit
Neonaticide
Pregnancy and Infant Loss Remembrance Day
Stillbirth

References

External links 

WHO 2005 report
European Perinatal Health Report 2010

Medical aspects of death
Obstetrics
Infant mortality
Medical terminology
Midwifery
Pregnancy with abortive outcome

fi:Kohtukuolema